Dibrugarh–Kolkata Express is a weekly Superfast train that connects Dibrugarh, known as the "Tea City of India", in eastern Assam and Kolkata, West Bengal. The train runs between Dibrugarh station (Location: Banipur, Station Code: DBRG) of N F Railway and Kolkata station (Chitpur, Station Code: KOAA) of Eastern Railway. It is named after the Dihing River, a tributary of the Brahmaputra river and an important river of the Dibrugarh district in Assam. This train was announced in the Railway Budget 2012/2013. The inaugural run took place on 4 September 2012, from Dibrugarh.

The train departs Dibrugarh every Tuesday at 14:10 hours to reach Kolkata Wednesday at 15:00 hours, and on return journey it departs Kolkata every Wednesday at 21:40 hours to reach Dibrugarh at 22:30 hours Friday. It has a total 20 halts covering Dhemaji, Gogamukh, North Lakhimpur, Viswanath Chariali, Rangapara North Jn, Udalguri, Tangla, Rangiya Jn, New Bongaigaon, New Cooch Behar, New Jalpaiguri, Malda Town, Azimganj, Nabadwip Dham, Bandel en-route Kolkata and vice versa. Composition of the train consists of AC Two Tier (2A) one coach, AC Three Tier (3A) three coach, Three Tier Sleeper (SL) eleven coach, two General Class Compartments. The train belongs to Northeast Frontier Railway zone of Indian Railways.

The train is a Superfast train from Dibrugarh to Kolkata other than the regular Kamrup Express, which takes 36 hours 10 mins to cover the distance between Dibrugarh and Howrah.

Schedule

Route
WEST BENGAL
 (Starts)

New Jalpaiguri (Siliguri)

ASSAM

Gohpur
Harmuti

Gogamukh
Dhemaji
 (Ends)

Coach composition

The train has LHB rakes with max speed of 110 kmph.

 1 AC II Tier
 3 AC III Tier
 11 Sleeper coaches
 1 AC hot buffet car
 2 General
 2 Generator cum Luggage/parcel van

Rake sharing

15906 / 15905 – Dibrugarh–Kanyakumari Vivek Express

Traction
From there onwards it is hauled by WAP-7 Locomotive of Electric Loco Shed, Howrah till .

References

Transport in Dibrugarh
Transport in Kolkata
Rail transport in Assam
Rail transport in West Bengal
Express trains in India